Laurence Connolly (1833 – 4 March 1908) was an Irish entrepreneur and politician.

Connolly was born in Louth. He worked for a time in his family's fruit merchant business in Dublin, before moving to Liverpool and setting up a similar business there. He later became a property developer.

He became active in Liverpool politics as a representative of the Irish Nationalist Party, becoming a member of Liverpool City Council. He was a personal friend of the party leader, Charles Stewart Parnell, who persuaded him to run for Parliament in South Longford, for which he was elected in 1885. In 1888, he resigned his seat, citing ill-health. There are no recorded contributions by him in the House of Commons.

He died in New Brighton in 1908.

Endnotes

External links 

1833 births
1908 deaths
Irish Parliamentary Party MPs
Members of the Parliament of the United Kingdom for County Longford constituencies (1801–1922)
UK MPs 1885–1886
UK MPs 1886–1892